Rubus probativus is an uncommon North American species of brambles in the rose family. It has been found only in the states of Florida, Georgia, and Alabama in the southeastern United States.

The genetics of Rubus is extremely complex, so that it is difficult to decide on which groups should be recognized as species. There are many rare species with limited ranges such as this. Further study is suggested to clarify the taxonomy.

References

probativus
Plants described in 1943
Flora of the Southeastern United States
Flora without expected TNC conservation status